Al-Dumayr Military Airport is a Syrian Arab Air Force installation located 40 kilometers north-east of Damascus, Syria.

The airbase was used extensively by the Syrian Arab Air Forces and Iranian Armed Forces during the Syrian Civil War.

History 
The base is used to support the army campaign on Eastern Ghouta. On February 22, 2018, Jaysh al-Islam bombed the airbase in an effort to weaken Syrian attacks on the rebel held enclave.

On 21 June 2022, four Syrian soldiers were killed near the airbase following an ambush by Islamic State fighters.

References

See also
List of Syrian Air Force bases

Syrian Air Force bases
Military installations of Syria